The 1st Biathlon World Championships were held in 1958 in Saalfelden, Austria. The men's 20 km individual and team were the only competitions.

Men's results

20 km individual

Each shot missing the target gave a penalty of 2 minutes.

20 km team

The times of the top 4 athletes from each nation in the individual race were added together.

Medal table

References

1958
World Championships
International sports competitions hosted by Austria
Sport in Salzburg (state)
1958 in Austrian sport
March 1958 sports events in Europe
Biathlon competitions in Austria